The Yorkshire Insurance Company was an English insurance company.

The company was founded in 1824, in York, as the Yorkshire Fire and Life Insurance Company.  Its objects were initially "to effect insurance against loss by fire and on lives and survivorships and the sale and purchase of annuities and reversions and the endowment of children".  In November 1824, the company purchased a fire engine, and from 1830 until 1876, it operated the fire brigade for the city of York.  In 1847, it constructed its headquarters building on St Helen's Square in the city.  In 1908, the company adopted its final name, and registered as a limited company.

The company took over the following insurance companies:
 1907: National Assurance Company of Ireland
 1912: London and Provincial Marine and General Insurance Company
 1913: Scottish Boiler and General Insurance Company
 1914: Guarantee Society
 1918: Ulster Marine Insurance Company
 1920: National Safe Deposit and Trustee Company
 1921: Lancashire and Yorkshire Reversionary Interest Company
 1922: Commercial Insurance Company of Ireland
 1955: Farmers' Finance and Insurance Office
 1961: Celtic Insurance Company
 1963: Scottish Insurance Corporation

In 1967, the majority of the company's shares were bought by the General Accident Fire and Life Assurance Corporation, which purchased the remainder in 1968.  Following this, General Accident's life insurance section, General Life, was renamed "Yorkshire-General Life", which it remained until 1985.

References

1824 establishments
1968 disestablishments
Companies based in York
Insurance companies of the United Kingdom